Rod Brent is a former Australian tennis player who was active during the 1960s and 1970s. He used to teach tennis at Cliff Street Racquet Club in New Rochelle.

References 

Australian male tennis players
Place of birth missing (living people)
Year of birth missing (living people)
Living people
Grand Slam (tennis) champions in boys' doubles
Australian Championships (tennis) junior champions